Fatih Yılmaz (born 19 May 2002) is a Turkish footballer who plays as a centre-back for TFF Third League club Osmaniyespor on loan from Giresunspor.

Career
Yılmaz is a youth product of Giresunspor, and joined their senior team in 2020. On 13 September 2020, he signed his first professional contract with the club. He made his professional debut with Giresunspor in a 2–1 Turkish Cup loss to Antalyaspor on 28 December 2021.

International career
Yılmaz was called up to a training camp for the Turkey U21s in January 2022.

References

External links
 
 

2002 births
Living people
Sportspeople from Giresun
Turkish footballers
Association football defenders
Giresunspor footballers
Süper Lig players
TFF First League players
TFF Third League players
21st-century Turkish people